Shaposhnikov may refer to
Shaposhnikov (surname)
Shaposhnikov, Belgorod Oblast, a rural locality in Russia
1902 Shaposhnikov, an asteroid
Russian destroyer Marshal Shaposhnikov (BPK 543), am Udaloy-class destroyer of the Russian Navy